Udaipur railway station is a railway station in Gomati district, Tripura. Its code is UDPU. It serves Udaipur, Tripura, city. The station lies on the Lumding–Sabroom section, which comes under the Lumding railway division of the Northeast Frontier Railway. The segment from Agartala to Sabroom via Udaipur became operational on 3 October 2019.

Station layout

Major trains

 55681/55682 Agartala–Garjee Passenger
 55683/55684 Garjee–Agartala Passenger

See also

References

External links

 Indian Railways site
 Indian railway fan club

Railway stations in Gomati district
Lumding railway division
2016 establishments in Tripura